Our Lady of Pompeii Church or Our Lady of Pompei Church may refer to:

Our Lady of Pompeii Roman Catholic Church, Yoogali in New South Wales, Australia
Shrine of the Virgin of the Rosary of Pompei in Pompei, Italy
Our Lady of Pompei Church, Victoria, Gozo in Malta
Parish Church of Our Lady of Pompei, Marsaxlokk in Malta
Holy Rosary Church (Bridgeport, Connecticut) or Church of Our Lady of Pompeii, in the United States
Our Lady of Pompeii Church (Manhattan) in New York, United States

See also